Rose Hooper (1876-1963) was an American painter of miniatures. Born in San Francisco, she was the daughter of Col. William B. Hooper, proprietor of the Occidental Hotel in San Francisco, CA, and his wife, Eleanor. The family was part of high society in San Francisco, and Rose Hooper was a debutante in the 1895–1896 season. Hooper married Charles Albert Plotner on October 25, 1903, in Philadelphia, PA. The couple had a son, Selden Hooper Plotner, but divorced in 1910. Hooper's second husband was William C. Lyons.

She studied at the San Francisco Art League under William Keith and Emil Carlsen. Further instruction in New York followed, under Amalia Küssner Coudert. In Dresden she studied with Otto Eckhardt and in Paris with Gabrielle Debillemont-Chardon. In 1903 she returned to her native city, where she remained until 1926, when she moved to New York.  There she remained until 1939. She later returned to California, living in Coronado from 1946 until 1958 and thereafter in San Francisco until her death. She received awards at the Alaska–Yukon–Pacific Exposition of 1909, the Panama–Pacific Exposition of 1915, and the 1929 exhibition of the California Society of Miniature Painters, of which organization she was a founding member. A portrait of a lady attributed to her is in the collection of the Metropolitan Museum of Art.

References

1876 births
1963 deaths
American portrait painters
American women painters
19th-century American painters
19th-century American women artists
20th-century American painters
20th-century American women artists
Painters from California
Artists from San Francisco